Wing Commander Pooja Thakur is a retired Indian Air Force Officer. She was the first female commanding officer of the Tri-Services Guard of Honour, which was inspected by then-US President Barack Obama at the Rashtrapati Bhawan in January 2015.

She also contributed during the development stage of the Guardians of the Skies, a videogame that features Indian Air Force pilots. She gave two Tedx Talks, one in 2015 and the other in 2017.

Military career 
She is from the 17 SSC (W) G Course. She was commissioned into the Administrative Branch of the Indian Air Force on 16 Jun 2001 and was promoted to the rank of Wing Commander on 16 June 2014.

Controversies 
She was refused a permanent commission, so she went to the AFT and filed a case.

References 

Indian Air Force officers
Indian Air Force personnel
Indian female military personnel
Living people
1979 births